Glamour is the sixth album of the Japanese hard rock band Show-Ya. The album was released on 24 August 1988. All musical arrangements are by Makoto Matsushita and Show-Ya. The single "Aisazu Ni Irarenai - Still Be Hangin' on" is Show-Ya's version of an unused demo from the recording sessions of Cheap Trick's Lap of Luxury album. The song is sung both in English and Japanese, with the lyrics translated by Keiko Terada. This album was mixed by Andy Johns in Los Angeles. It reached position No. 16 in the Japanese Oricon chart.

Track listing
"I Gotta Your Love" (Keiko Terada) – 3:46
"The Wind" (Miki Igarashi, Terada) – 3:30
"Aisazu ni Irarenai - Still Be Hangin' On" (愛さずにいられない – Still Be Hangin' On) (Jonathan Cain & Rick Nielsen, trans. Terada) – 3:39
"Come On!" (Show-Ya, Terada) – 4:11
"Dakareta Mama" (抱かれたまま) (Miki Nakamura, Terada) – 4:25
"Keep Me in Your Heart" (Tom Keifer) – 2:50
"Rock Train" (Satomi Senba & Miki Tsunoda) – 4:43
"Fixer" (フィクサー) (Terada) – 4:24
"Yoru no Sei Ja Nai" (夜のせいじゃない) (Terada) – 4:48
"Kagirinaku Haruka na Jiyuu E (Go Again)" (限りなくはるかな自由へ～Go Again～) (Igarashi, Terada) – 4:59
"We'll Still Be Hangin' On" (Jonathan Cain & Rick Nielsen) – 4:58

Personnel

Band Members
Keiko Terada – vocals
Miki Igarashi – guitars
Miki Nakamura – keyboards
Satomi Senba – bass
Miki Tsunoda – drums

Production
Nobuo Maeda, Yoshikazu Nakabayashi – engineers
Paul Wertheimer – engineer, mixing at Ameraycan Studio, Hollywood, California
Ken Nakai, Micajah Ryan, Sachio Yotsumoto, Toshimi Nanseki – assistant engineers
Andy Johns – mixing
Yoichi Aikawa – mastering

References

External links
Show-Ya discography 
"Aisazu ni Irarenai - Still Be Hangin' On" video clip

Show-Ya albums
1988 albums
EMI Records albums
Japanese-language albums